KHTL may refer to:

 The ICAO airport code for Roscommon County - Blodgett Memorial Airport in Houghton Lake, Michigan, United States
 KVBM-LP, a low-power radio station (104.7 FM) licensed to serve Killeen, Texas, United States, which held the call sign KHTL-LP from 2006 to 2022
 KSNB-TV, a television station (channel 4) licensed to serve Superior, Nebraska, United States, which formerly used the call sign KHTL